The alphorn or alpenhorn or alpine horn is a labrophone, consisting of a straight several-meter-long wooden natural horn of conical bore, with a wooden cup-shaped mouthpiece. Traditionally the Alphorn was made of one single piece, or two parts at most, and made from the wood of a red pine tree. Sometimes the trees would bend from the weight of snow during the wintertime, and this caused them to have the larger and bent mouthpiece at their ends. Modern Alphorns are sometimes made from three distinct parts that can be stuck together, this is to make them easier to transport via automobile, or even carried by hand, and today are more frequently made from the wood of a spruce tree or fir tree. It is used by mountain dwellers in the Swiss Alps. Similar wooden horns were used for communication in most mountainous regions of Europe, from the Alps to the Carpathians. Alphorns are today used as musical instruments.

History 

For a long time, scholars believed that the alphorn had been derived from the Roman-Etruscan lituus, because of their resemblance in shape, and because of the word liti, meaning Alphorn in the dialect of Obwalden. There is no documented evidence for this theory however, and also the word liti was probably borrowed from 16th–18th century writings in Latin, where the word lituus could describe various wind instruments, such as the horn, the crumhorn, or the cornett. Swiss naturalist Conrad Gesner used the words lituum alpinum for the first known detailed description of the alphorn in his De raris et admirandis herbis in 1555. The oldest known document using the German word Alphorn is a page from a 1527 account book from the former Cistercian abbey St. Urban near Pfaffnau mentioning the payment of two Batzen for an itinerant alphorn player from the Valais.

17th–19th century collections of alpine myths and legends suggest that alphorn-like instruments had frequently been used as signal instruments in village communities since old times or earlier, sometimes substituting for the lack of church bells. Surviving artifacts, dating back to as far as ca. AD 1400, include wooden labrophones in their stretched form, like the alphorn, or coiled versions, such as the "Büchel" and the "Allgäuisches Waldhorn" or "Ackerhorn". The alphorn's exact origins remain indeterminate, and the ubiquity of horn-like signal instruments in valleys throughout Europe may indicate a long history of cross influences regarding their construction and usage.

Construction and qualities

The alphorn is carved from solid softwood, generally spruce but sometimes pine. In former times, the alphorn maker would find a tree bent at the base in the shape of an alphorn, but modern makers piece the wood together at the base. A cup-shaped mouthpiece carved out of a block of hard wood is added and the instrument is complete.

An alphorn made at Rigi-Kulm, Schwyz, and now in the Victoria and Albert Museum, measures  in length and has a straight tube. The Swiss alphorn varies in shape according to the locality, being curved near the bell in the Bernese Oberland. Michael Praetorius mentions an alphorn-like instrument under the name of Hölzern Trummet (wooden trumpet) in Syntagma Musicum (Wittenberg, 1615–1619; Pl. VIII).

The alphorn has no lateral openings and therefore gives the pure natural harmonic series of the open pipe. The notes of the natural harmonic series overlap, but do not exactly correspond, to notes found in the familiar chromatic scale in standard Western equal temperament. Most prominently within the alphorn's range, the 7th and 11th harmonics are particularly noticeable, because they fall between adjacent notes in the chromatic scale.

Accomplished alphornists often command a range of nearly three octaves, consisting of the 2nd through the 16th notes of the harmonic series. The availability of the higher tones is due in part to the relatively small diameter of the bore of the mouthpiece and tubing in relation to the overall length of the horn.

The well-known "Ranz des Vaches" (score; audio) is a traditional Swiss melody often heard on the alphorn. The song describes the time of bringing the cows to the high country at milk making time. Rossini introduced the "Ranz des Vaches" into his masterpiece William Tell, along with many other delightful melodies scattered throughout the opera in vocal and instrumental parts that are well-suited to the alphorn. Brahms wrote to Clara Schumann that the inspiration for the dramatic entry of the horn in the introduction to the last movement of his First Symphony was an alphorn melody he heard while vacationing in the Rigi area of Switzerland. For Clara's birthday in 1868 Brahms sent her a greeting that was to be sung with the melody.

Music for alphorn

Among music composed for the alphorn:

Concerto Grosso No. 1 (2013) for four alphorns and orchestra by Georg Friedrich Haas
Sinfonia pastorale for corno pastoriccio in G (alphorn) and string orchestra (1755)  by Leopold Mozart
Concerto for alphorn and orchestra (1970) by Jean Daetwyler
Concerto No. 2 for alphorn (with flute, string orchestra and percussion) (1983) by Daetwyler
Dialogue with Nature for alphorn, flute, and orchestra by Daetwyler
Super Alpen King for three alphorns and orchestra by Ghislain Muller (2001) VSP orkestra / Arkady Shilkloper, Renaud Leipp
Concertino rustico (1977) by Ferenc Farkas
Begegnung for three alphorns and concert band, by Kurt Gable.
Säumerweg-Blues (audio played by Kurt Ott)  among many compositions by Hans-Jürg Sommer, Alphorn Musik
Messe for alphorn and choir by Franz Schüssele Alphorn-Center
 Erbauliche Studie für 12 Alphörner in Abwesenheit von Bergen by Mathias Rüegg (1998)
Wolf Music: Tapio for alphorn and echoing instruments (2003) by R. Murray Schafer
Le Berger fantaisiste for three alphorns and orchestra by Ghislain Muller, Arkady Shilkloper, Renaud Leipp, Serge Haessler, VSP orkestra (2001)
Bob Downes & The Alphorn Brothers (2015) by Bob Downes Open Music (CD rec. 2004)
 Concerto for alphorn in F and orchestra by Daniel Schnyder (2004)
 Matterhorn (a prelude for alphorn and wind orchestra) by Robert Litton (2013)
 Alpine Trail for alphorn and orchestra by Arkady Shilkloper
 Lai nair for alphorn and contrabass by John Wolf Brennan (2015)
 Der Bergschuh for alphorn and marching band by Daniel Schnyder
 Crested Butte Mountain for alphorn and wind band (or brass sextet, strings, or horn septet) by Arkady Shilkloper
 Robin for alphorn and wind band (big band) by Arkady Shilkloper
 Fanfare for four alphorns by Arkady Shilkloper

In popular culture
The alphorn is prominently featured in advertisements for Ricola cough drops, which are manufactured in Laufen, Switzerland
Brief scene in Rammstein's "Dicke Titten".

See also
Bucium, a type of alphorn used by mountain dwellers in Romania
Didgeridoo, an instrument of Aboriginal Australian origins, traditionally made from a hollowed out eucalyptus tree trunk
Erke, a similar instrument of Argentine Northwest
Kuhreihen, a type of melody played on an alphorn
Tiba, wind instrument made of wood or metal that originates in the Grisons canton; it was used by shepherds on alpine meadows in the Alps
Tibetan horn, long trumpet or horn used in Tibetan Buddhist and Mongolian buddhist ceremonies
Trembita, a Ukrainian alpine horn made of wood
Trutruca, wind instrument played mainly amongst the Mapuche people of Chile and Argentina; produces a sound that is loud and severe, with few tonal variations

References

Further reading
 Bachmann-Geiser, Brigitte, Das Alphorn: Vom Lock- zum Rockinstrument. Paul Haupt, Berne, 1999. 
 Franz Schüssele, Alphorn und Hirtenhorn in Europa, book and CD with 63 sound samples available at Alphorn-Center,

External links

 Third Annual North American Alphorn Retreat
 Alphorn in concert Concert and composition contest taking place annually in Oensingen, Canton Solothurn, Switzerland
 International Alphorn Festival at Nendaz, Canton Valais, Switzerland
 VSP orkestra & Arkady Shilkloper alphorn jazz & improvisations, composer / arranger : Ghislain Muller, Arkady Shilkloper, Pascal Beck

National symbols of Switzerland
Swiss musical instruments
Natural horns and trumpets